Marcos Daniel Quiroga (born 28 November 1990) is an Argentine professional footballer who plays as a midfielder for Ben Hur.

Career
Libertad were Quiroga's opening club. After four years in Sunchales, he moved to Boca Unidos in 2011 prior to the Torneo Argentino A side Libertad resigning Quiroga midway through the 2011–12 season. Fifty-eight appearances followed, along with five goals which includes two goals against both Central Norte and Central Córdoba. After a six-month stint with Sportivo Patria in the third tier, Quiroga joined Patronato of Primera B Nacional. His first campaign ended with promotion to the Primera División. His top-flight debut arrived on 17 February 2016 versus Arsenal de Sarandí, an appearance against Quilmes followed.

Quiroga returned to Primera B Nacional in June 2016 with Instituto, before Juventud Unida became the midfielder's sixth senior team just over a year later. On 30 May 2018, after relegation with Juventud Unida, Quiroga signed for Los Andes. His first appearance came in a defeat at the Estadio Centenario to Quilmes on 3 September. He scored one goal, versus Defensores de Belgrano, in twelve games as they suffered relegation. Having left Los Andes in June 2019, Quiroga signed for Ferrocarril del Estado of Liga Rafaelina in July. Ahead of January 2020, Quiroga agreed a move to Ben Hur in Torneo Regional Federal Amateur.

Career statistics
.

References

External links

1990 births
Living people
People from Castellanos Department
Argentine footballers
Association football midfielders
Torneo Argentino A players
Torneo Federal A players
Primera Nacional players
Argentine Primera División players
Libertad de Sunchales footballers
Boca Unidos footballers
Sportivo Patria footballers
Club Atlético Patronato footballers
Instituto footballers
Juventud Unida de Gualeguaychú players
Club Atlético Los Andes footballers
Club Sportivo Ben Hur players
Sportspeople from Santa Fe Province